The vice-chancellor of the executive head of the University of Delhi.

Vice-chancellors of DU
The vice-chancellors of DU are as follows.

 Hari Singh Gaur (1922-26)
 Moti Sagar (1926-30)
 Abdur Rehman (1930-34)
 Ram Kishor (1934-38)
 Maurice Gwyer (1938-50)
 S.N. Sen (1950-53)
 G. S. Mahajan (1953-57)
 V.K.R.V. Rao (1957-60)
 N.K. Sidhant (1960-61)
 C. D. Deshmukh (1962-67)
 B. N. Ganguly (1967-69)
 K.N. Raj (1969-70)
 Sarup Singh (1971-74)
 R.C. Mehrotra (1974-79)
 Gurbakhsh Singh (1980-85)
 Moonis Raza (1985-90)
 Upendra Baxi (1990-94)
 V.R. Mehta (1995-2000)
 Deepak Nayyar (2000-2005)
 Deepak Pantal (2005-2010)
 Dinesh Singh (2010-2015)
 Yogesh Tyagi (2016-2020)
 Yogesh Singh (2021-

See also
University of Delhi

References

Delhi University
Vice-Chancellors by university in India